Ivana Djatevska (born 13 April 2003) is a Macedonian female handballer for ŽRK Vardar and the North Macedonia national team.

She represented the North Macedonia at the 2022 European Women's Handball Championship.

References

External links

2003 births
Living people
People from Skopje